Mario Alejandro Costas (born April 24, 1981 in Santiago del Estero) is an Argentinian football striker playing in PSM Makassar.

Honours

Club honors
Ferro Carril Oeste
Primera B Metropolitana (1): 2002–03

Luis Ángel Firpo
Primera División (1): Apertura 2007

Individual honors
Primera División Top Scorer (1): Clausura 2007

References

External links
 
 Profile at liga-indonesia.co.id

Living people
1981 births
Argentine footballers
Argentine expatriate footballers
Association football forwards
Expatriate footballers in Colombia
Expatriate footballers in El Salvador
Expatriate footballers in Indonesia
Expatriate footballers in Syria
Ferro Carril Oeste footballers
Estudiantes de Buenos Aires footballers
Independiente Rivadavia footballers
Club Atlético Temperley footballers
PSMS Medan players
C.D. Luis Ángel Firpo footballers
América de Cali footballers
Primera B Metropolitana players
Categoría Primera A players
Liga 1 (Indonesia) players
Syrian Premier League players
People from Santiago del Estero
Sportspeople from Santiago del Estero Province